Opium: Diary of a Cure is a 1930 work by the French artist and writer Jean Cocteau. The book details Cocteau's recovery from addiction to opium.

References

1930 non-fiction books
French non-fiction books
French-language books
Non-fiction books about drugs
Works about opium
Works by Jean Cocteau